A door knocker is an item of door furniture that allows people outside a house or other dwelling or building to alert those inside to their presence.  A door knocker has a part fixed to the door, and a part (usually metal) which is attached to the door by a hinge, and may be lifted and used to strike a plate fitted to the door, or the door itself, making a noise. The struck plate, if present, would be supplied and fitted with the knocker. Door knockers are often ornate, but may be no more than a simple fitting with a metal bob, or ring.

German professor Franz Sales Meyer distinguished three kinds of door knocker: the "ring", the "hammer", and an ornate category which could take the shape of an animal or another figure. High demand for antique door knockers in the early 20th century in the United States caused forged versions to emerge.


Gallery of door knockers around the world

See also
Doorbell

References

External links 

 "Heurtoir" - French dictionary of architecture – Illustrated 

Door furniture
Ironmongery